Gangaram is a remote village in Bijinapalle Mandal of Nagarkurnool district, Telangana, India.

References 

 Census of India Official Website

Villages in Nagarkurnool district